This is a list of Boeing 707 operators.

Current military/government operators

 
 Chilean Air Force
 
 Indian Air Force
 
 Iranian Air Force
 
 Israeli Air Force
 
 United States Air Force (Operates 707-based E-3 AWACS and E-8 JSTARS)
 United States Navy (Operates 707-based E-6 TACAMO)
 
 Venezuelan Air Force

Former military/government operators
 
 National Air Force of Angola
 
 Argentine Air Force / LADE
 
 Royal Australian Air Force
 No. 33 Squadron RAAF
 No. 37 Squadron RAAF
 
 Benin Air Force
 
 Royal Canadian Air Force
 
 Colombian Air Force operated one aircraft in a tanker configuration
 
Egyptian Air Force operated three ex-Egypt Air Boeing 707-366Cs

West German Air Force/German Air Force
 
 Indonesian Air Force
 
 Italian Air Force operated 4 aircraft from 1991 to 2005
 
 Malian Air Force
 
 Moroccan Air Force operated two aircraft, including one converted to a tanker configuration
 
 Nepalese Army
 
 
 Pakistan Air Force
 
 Paraguayan Air Force
 
 Peruvian Air Force operated one aircraft in a tanker configuration

Philippine Air Force

Portuguese Air Force
 
 Romanian Government (Romavia)
 
 Royal Saudi Air Force
 Saudi Arabian Royal Flight

South African Air Force
 
 Spanish Air Force operated four Boeing 707s — two tankers, one cargo aircraft and one configured for electronic warfare. The final one was retired on 3 October 2016

Current commercial/other operators

Omega Aerial Refueling Services

Past operators

Africa
 
 Air Algérie
 
Angola Air Charter
TAAG Angola Airlines
 
 Global Airways
 Hewa Bora Airways
 Kinshasa Airways
 
 Egyptair
 ZAS Airline of Egypt
 
 Ethiopian Airlines
 
 Mahfooz Aviation
 
 Cargoplus Aviation
 
 Air Afrique
 
 Kenya Airways
 Simba Air Cargo
 
 Johnsons Air
 Libyan Arab Airlines
 
 Air Mauritius
 
 Royal Air Maroc
 
 ADC Airlines
 Nigeria Airways
 
 Air Rhodesia
 
 Air Seychelles
 
 Somali Airways
  South Africa
 South African Airways
 Trek Airways
 
 Sudan Air
 Air West
 Azza Transport
 Trans Arabian Air Transport
 
 Uganda Airlines
 
 Air Zaire
 
 Aero Zambia
 Zambia Airways
 
 Air Zimbabwe

America
 
 Aerolíneas Argentinas
 
 Lloyd Aéreo Boliviano
 
 Skymaster Airlines
 Transbrasil
 Varig
 
 Canadian Forces Air Command – Military
 Pacific Western Airlines
 Quebecair
 Transair
 Wardair
 
 Ladeco
 LAN Chile
 
 Aerocondor
 AeroTal
 Avianca
 SAM Colombia
 
 Aeca Carga
 Ecuatoriana de Aviación
 SAETA
 
 Copa Airlines
 
 Líneas Aéreas Paraguayas
 
 Aeronaves de Puerto Rico
 
 Surinam Airways
 
 British West Indian Airways (BWIA)
 
 Aeroamerica
 Air Florida
 Alaska Airlines
 American Airlines
 American Eagle – Air charter operator not affiliated with American Airlines
 American Trans Air
 Braniff International Airways
 Continental Airlines
 Global International Airways
 Northeast Airlines
 Northwest Airlines
 Pan American World Airways
 Perfect Air Tours
 Ports-of-Call
 Skystar International Airlines
 South Pacific Island Airways
 Trans World Airlines
 Western Airlines

Asia
 
 Biman Bangladesh Airlines
 
 Cathay Pacific
 
 Air India
 
Bayu Indonesia
Bouraq Indonesia Airlines
Garuda Indonesia
Merpati Nusantara Airlines
Merpati Nusantara Airlines Cargo
Pelita Air - transferred to Indonesian Air Force
 
 Iran Air
 Saha Airlines
 
 Iraqi Airways
 
 El Al
 MAOF.
 
 Royal Jordanian
 
 Kuwait Airways
 
 Middle East Airlines
 Trans Mediterranean Airways
 /
 Malaysia-Singapore Airlines
 
 Malaysia Airlines
 Sabah Air
 
 Pakistan International Airlines
 
 Air China
 China Southwest Airlines
 
 Philippine Airlines
 Air Manila International
 Philippine Air Force – Military
 
 Saudia
 
 ADCO Airlines
 
 Singapore Airlines
 Singapore Airlines Cargo
 
 Korean Air
 
 Air Vietnam
 
 Air Ceylon
 
 China Airlines
 Civil Air Transport
 
 Air Siam – Ceased Operations 
 
 Dolphin Air
 Gulf Falcon
 
 Vietnam Airlines

Europe
 
 Austrian Airlines
 Montana Austria
 
 Abelag Airways
 Sabena
 Sobelair
 Trans European Airlines
 
 Cyprus Airways
 
 Conair
 
 Air France
 
 Olympic Airways
 
 Malév Hungarian Airlines
 
 Aer Lingus
 
 Luxair
 
 Air Malta
 
 Transavia Holland
 
 Trans Polar
 
 Air Atlantis
 TAP Air Portugal
 
 TAROM
 
 Turkish Airlines
 Boğaziçi Hava Transport
 Birgenair
 
 Anglo Cargo
 BEA Airtours
 BOAC
 BOAC-Cunard
 Britannia Airways
 British Airtours
 British Airways
 British Caledonian Airways
 British Cargo Airlines
 British Eagle
 British Midland
 Caledonian Airways
 Cunard Eagle Airways
 Dan Air Services
 Donaldson International Airways
 Heavylift Cargo Airlines
 Invicta International Airlines
 Laker Airways
 Lloyd International Airways
 Monarch Airlines
 Scimitar Airlines
 Tradewinds Airways
 
 Deutsche Lufthansa
 
 Air Yugoslavia
 JAT Yugoslav Airlines

Oceania
 
 Qantas
 
 Air Niugini

References
Citations

Bibliography

707
Boeing 707